Evins-Bivings House, also known as the Dr. James Bivings House, is a historic home located at Spartanburg, Spartanburg County, South Carolina.  It was built about 1854, and is a two-story, white clapboard house in the Greek Revival style.  The house  features double piazzas with massive Doric order columns and notable balustrades. Also on the property are the original kitchen, slave quarters, smokehouse, and well. It was built by  Dr. James Bivings, who founded Glendale Mills.

It was listed on the National Register of Historic Places in 1970.

References

Houses on the National Register of Historic Places in South Carolina
Greek Revival houses in South Carolina
Houses completed in 1856
Houses in Spartanburg, South Carolina
National Register of Historic Places in Spartanburg, South Carolina
Slave cabins and quarters in the United States